Spelbrook railway station, also known as Spellbrook railway station, Spelbroke railway station and Spillbrook railway station served the hamlet of Spellbrook, Hertfordshire, England, from 1841 to 1842 on the Northern and Eastern Railway.

History
The station was opened on 22 November 1841 by the Northern and Eastern Railway. It was a temporary terminus that was only open for 6 months, closing on 16 May 1842 when  opened.

References

Disused railway stations in Hertfordshire
Railway stations in Great Britain opened in 1841
Railway stations in Great Britain closed in 1842
1841 establishments in England
1842 disestablishments in England